St Saviour's Church, St. Savior's Church, Church of St Saviour, or variants thereof may refer to:

Albania
St. Saviour's Church, Herebel
St Saviour's Church, Kërçishti i Epërm
St. Saviour's Church, Tremishtë
St. Saviour's Church, Vuno

Australia
St Saviour's Anglican Church, South Johnstone, Cassowary Coast Region, Queensland
St Saviour's Cathedral, Goulburn
St Saviour's Church, former name of Sacred Heart Church in Hindmarsh, Adelaide

Canada
St. Saviour's Anglican Church (Barkerville, British Columbia)
St. Saviour's Anglican Church (Orono, Ontario)

Croatia
St. Saviour Church, Dubrovnik

France
 Vabres Cathedral (French: Cathédrale Saint-Sauveur-et-Saint-Pierre de Vabres), a former cathedral now used as a church

Ireland
St Saviour’s Priory, Dublin

Latvia
St. Saviour's Church, Riga

Kosovo 
 St Saviour's Church, Prizren

Macedonia
St Saviour's Church, Skopje

New Zealand
 St Saviour's Chapel, Christchurch

Turkey
Chora Church, Istanbul, dedicated to St Saviour

United Kingdom
St Saviour's Church for the Deaf, now St Thomas Cathedral, Acton, London
St Saviour's Church, Astley Bridge, Greater Manchester
St Saviour's Church, Aughton, Lancashire
Bermondsey Abbey, London, dedicated to St Saviour
St Saviour's Church, Bath, Somerset
St Saviour's Church, Branston, Staffordshire
St Saviour's Church, Chorlton on Medlock, Manchester
St Saviour's Church, Cuerden, Lancashire
St Saviour's Church, Eastbourne, East Sussex
St Saviour's Church, Forest Gate, east London
St Saviour's Church, Harome, North Yorkshire
Church of St Saviour, High Green, South Yorkshire, a listed building in Sheffield
St Saviour's Church, Hockley, Birmingham
St Saviour's Church, Leicester
St Saviour's Church, Norwich
St Saviours in the Meadows, Nottingham, Nottinghamshire
St Saviour's Church, Oxton, Merseyside
St Saviour, Pimlico, London
St Saviour's Church, Puxton, Somerset
St Saviour's Church, Retford, Nottinghamshire
St Saviour Church, Richmond Hill, Leeds, West Yorkshire
St Saviour's Church, Ringley, Greater Manchester
St Saviour's Church, Saltley, Birmingham
Church of St Saviour-on-the-Cliff, Shanklin, Isle of Wight
St Saviour's Church, Shotton Colliery, County Durham; see Thomas Frederick Hardwich
St Saviour's Church, now Southwark Cathedral, London
St Saviour's Church, Splott, Cardiff
St Saviour's Church, Stydd, Lancashire
St Saviour's Church, Tetbury, Gloucestershire
Church of St Saviour, Thurlstone, Thurlstone, South Yorkshire
St Saviour's, Walmer, Kent
St Saviour's Church, Wildboarclough, Cheshire
St Saviour's Church, York

United States
Saint Saviour's Episcopal Church and Rectory, Maine

See also
St Saviour's Cathedral (disambiguation)
Church of Our Saviour (disambiguation)
Saviour's Church (disambiguation)